This is a list of public utilities.

Natural gas companies
 - National Petroleum Corporation, Barbados National Oil Company Ltd.
 - Comgás
 - List of Canadian natural gas companies
 - China Natural Gas, Towngas China
 - China Resources Gas, The Hong Kong and China Gas Company
 - EGAS
 - List of French natural gas companies
 - List of Japan natural gas companies
 - Petronas
 - Sui Northern Gas Pipelines Limited, Sui Southern Gas Company Limited
 - Endesa, Iberdrola, Naturgy, Repsol, TotalEnergies
 - CPC Corporation
 - PTT
 - List of British natural gas companies
 - List of United States natural gas companies

Electricity companies 
 - Lumo Energy, EnergyAustralia, Origin Energy, TRUenergy, SEC Victoria (fmr.), Powercor, Click Energy, AGL, Alinta, Citipower, ETSA Utilities, Western Power, Country Energy, Energex, Integral Energy, ActewAGL, Ergon Energy, Power and Water
 - Summit Group, Power Grid Company of Bangladesh Ltd, Electricity Generation Company of Bangladesh Ltd
 - Barbados Light and Power Company Ltd.
 - Electrabel
 - Botswana Power Corporation
 - Eletrobrás, AES Eletropaulo, CPFL Energia, Celesc, CEMIG, CESP, Copel, Light S.A., CEEE, Energisa
 - List of Canadian electric utilities
 - State Grid Corporation, China Southern Power Grid
 - Hongkong Electric, CLP Power
 - Companhia de Electricidade de Macau
 - Union Electrica
 - CEZ Group
 - Egyptian Electricity Holding Company
 - Ethiopian Electric Power Corporation
 - Fortum
 - EDF, Engie, List of French electric utilities
 - E.ON, RWE, EnBW
 - PPC (DEI) (Greek Hydro), List of electric power companies in Greece
 - Orkuveita Reykjavíkur
 - List of Electricity Organizations in India, India: NTPC, Power Grid Corporation of India Ltd.(PGCIL), KPTCL, MSEB, Tata Power, BSES Rajdhani Power Ltd New Delhi, BSES Yamuna Power Ltd New Delhi
 - Perusahaan Listrik Negara
 - Enel, Edison, A2A, ACEA, Hera, Sorgenia
 - Kansai Electric Power, Tokyo Electric Power, Chubu Electric Power, Chugoku Electric Power, Hokuriku Electric Power, Hokkaido Electric Power, Kyushu Electric Power, Tohoku Electric Power, Shikoku Electric Power, Okinawa Electric Power, J-POWER
 - Gecol
 - Tenaga Nasional Berhad
 - Genesis Energy, Mercury Energy, Meridian Energy, Transpower
 - Meralco
 - Singapore Power
 - Eskom
 - Korea Electric Power Corporation
 - Endesa, Iberdrola, Naturgy, Repsol, TotalEnergies
 - Vattenfall
 - Taiwan Power Company
 - Electricity Generating Authority of Thailand, Provincial Electricity Authority, Metropolitan Electricity Authority
 - EDF Energy, E.ON UK, National Grid, RWE npower, Scottish Power, Scottish and Southern Energy, Drax Power and Good Energy, Ecotricity, Alkane Energy, Ovo Energy
 - List of United States electric companies

Telephone companies
 - Telstra, Optus, Vodafone, Hutchison Telecom(3G network), AAPT, Primus Telecom, Nextgen Networks, Agile Communications, TransACT
 - Liberty Latin America
 - Botswana Telecommunications Corporation
 - Brasil Telecom, Oi, Vivo, TIM, Telefónica Brasil
 - List of Canadian telephone companies

 - PCCW Limited, New World Telephone, Hutchison Telecom
 - Companhia de Telecomunicações de Macau
 - ETECSA
 - telecom egypt, orange egypt, vodafone egypt, etisalat egypt
 - List of French telephone companies
 - Deutsche Telekom, Arcor AG, Freenet AG, T-Mobile, Vodafone Germany,1&1 Drillisch
 - Hellenic Telecommunication Organization
 - Airtel, BSNL, MTNL, Vodafone Idea, Jio
 - Telkom
 - Eircom, BT Ireland, Smart Telecom, Vodafone Ireland, Hutchison 3G, O2 (Telefónica Europe)
 - List of Italian telephone companies
 - NTT, (NTT East, and NTT West)
 - Telekom Malaysia
 - Mobilink, Ufone, Telenor, Zong
 - Philippine Long Distance Telephone Company
 - SingTel
 - Telkom
 - Telefónica, Orange, Vodafone, Yoigo
 - Chunghwa Telecom, FarEasTone, Taiwan Mobile
 - TOT, CAT Telecom, True Corporation, DTAC, AIS, JAS Mobile
 - List of United States telephone companies

Water companies
 - Unitywater, Queensland Urban Utilities
 - Barbados Water Authority
 - Water Utilities Corporation
 - Sabesp, Sanepar, Copasa, Semasa

 - Water Supplies Department
 - Macao Water
 - Holding company for water and wastewater, Alexandria Water Company
 - SAUR, Suez Environnement, Veolia Environnement
 - EYDAP
 - Irish Water
 - Hera, Seabo
 - Maynilad Water Services, Manila Water Company, Inc., Metropolitan Waterworks and Sewerage System
 - Canal de Isabel II, Grupo Agbar
 - Taiwan Water Corporation
 - List of United Kingdom water companies
 - List of United States water companies

Steam companies 
Note: some of these companies are still trading, others are listed here for historical interest.
 American District Steam Company
 Boston Heating Company
 Compagnie Parisienne de Chauffage Urbain
 Detroit Thermal
 New York Steam Company, now Con Edison Steam Operations
 Trigen Energy Corporation

Former hydraulic power companies 
 Itaipú Binacional *
 Liverpool Hydraulic Power Company *
 London Hydraulic Power Company, defunct since 1977 *

See also
 Off-the-grid

Utility companies, Public